Hudson's black tyrant (Knipolegus hudsoni) is a species of bird in the family Tyrannidae. It is named after Argentine-British ornithologist William Henry Hudson.

It breeds in central Argentina and winters northwards, reaching Bolivia and Paraguay.

References

Hudson's black tyrant
Birds of Argentina
Hudson's black tyrant
Hudson's black tyrant
Taxonomy articles created by Polbot